Onehunga Havili (born 16 February 1996) is a Tongan born Rugby player who currently plays for the French Rugby Pro D2 club, Aurillac.

Havili toured New Zealand with a Tongan under-14 side, and was recruited by Sacred Heart College, Auckland. He then played for the Blues under-18s before moving to Australia to join Perth's Future Force academy.

In 2017 he was selected for the Tongan rugby squad.

References

Tongan rugby union players
1996 births
Living people
Tonga international rugby union players
Sunwolves players
Rugby union locks
Rugby union flankers
Rugby union number eights
Perth Spirit players
Western Force players
Exeter Chiefs players
Stade Aurillacois Cantal Auvergne players
Utah Warriors players